Casablanca Cathedral, or Church of the Sacred Heart, is a former Roman Catholic church located in Casablanca, Morocco.

History 
The Casablanca church was constructed in 1930. The cathedral ceased its religious function in 1956, after the independence of Morocco. It subsequently became a cultural centre which is open to visitors. It has hosted numerous art exhibitions. The Institut Français in Casablanca even organized an electronic music night inside nave of the former church on October 10, 2015.

Architecture 
The church was designed by French architect Paul Tournon, using the Art Deco style. It is commonly referred to as a cathedral, although in reality it has never technically been one as it was never the seat of a bishop.

See also
 St. Peter's Cathedral, Rabat
 French Church of Tangier
 Christianity in Morocco

References

Roman Catholic churches completed in 1930
Religious buildings and structures in Casablanca
Roman Catholic cathedrals in Morocco
Gothic Revival church buildings in Morocco
Tourist attractions in Casablanca
20th-century Roman Catholic church buildings
20th-century architecture in Morocco